Ho Thành Chinh (born 21 December 1941) is a Vietnamese sprinter. He competed in the men's 100 metres at the 1964 Summer Olympics.

References

1941 births
Living people
Athletes (track and field) at the 1964 Summer Olympics
Vietnamese male sprinters
Olympic athletes of Vietnam
Place of birth missing (living people)